was a Japanese film director. His main interest as a filmmaker lay in the depiction of the lower strata of Japanese society. A key figure in the Japanese New Wave, who continued working into the 21st century, Imamura is the only director from Japan to win two Palme d'Or awards.

Biography

Early life
Imamura was born to an upper-middle-class doctor's family in Tokyo in 1926. For a short time following the end of the war, Imamura participated in the black market selling cigarettes and liquor. He studied Western history at Waseda University, but spent more time participating in theatrical and political activities. He cited a viewing of Akira Kurosawa's Rashomon in 1950 as an early inspiration, and said he saw it as an indication of the new freedom of expression possible in Japan in the post-war era.

Upon graduation from Waseda in 1951, Imamura began his film career working as an assistant to Yasujirō Ozu at Shochiku Studios on films like Early Summer and Tokyo Story. Imamura was uncomfortable with the "picture-postcard view" (Nigel Kendall) with which Ozu portrayed Japanese society, as well as with his rigid directing of actors, although he later admitted that he profited from his apprenticeship for Ozu in terms of gaining technical knowledge. While Imamura's films were to have a quite different style from Ozu's, Imamura, like Ozu, was to focus on what he saw as particularly Japanese elements of society in his films. "I've always wanted to ask questions about the Japanese, because it's the only people I'm qualified to describe," he said. He expressed surprise that his films were appreciated overseas, even doubting that they could be understood.

Studio director
Imamura left Shochiku in 1954 to join the Nikkatsu studios. There he worked as an assistant director to Yūzō Kawashima, with whom he shared an interest in the "real" Japan with its "uncivilized", amoral protagonists, in opposition to the "official" version (Donald Richie). He also co-wrote the screenplay to Kawashima's Sun in the Last Days of the Shogunate, and much later edited a book about Kawashima, entitled Sayonara dake ga jinsei da.

In 1958, Imamura made his directorial debut at Nikkatsu, Stolen Desire, about a travelling theater troupe which combines kabuki with striptease, a film which "characteristically finds some vitality in vulgarity" (Jonathan Rosenbaum). He continued to direct films the studio had assigned him to, including Nishi Ginza Station, a comedy based on a Frankie Nagai pop song, and the black comedy Endless Desire. My Second Brother, an "uncharacteristically tender film" (Alexander Jacoby), portrayed a community of zainichi in a poor mining town.

His 1961 satire Pigs and Battleships, of which Imamura later said that it was the kind of film he always had wanted to make, depicted black market trades between the U.S. military and the local underworld at Yokosuka. Due to the film's controversial nature and Imamura's overrunning production time and costs, Nikkatsu did not allow Imamura to direct another project for two years, forcing him to concentrate on screenwriting. He followed this hiatus with the 1963 The Insect Woman, which was shown in competition at the Berlin International Film Festival, and the 1964 Unholy Desire. All three films presented female protagonists who were survivors, persevering despite misfortunes. Imamura disliked the self-sacrificing women portrayed in films like Kenji Mizoguchi's The Life of Oharu and Mikio Naruse's Floating Clouds, arguing that "they don't really exist...My heroines are true to life".

Independent filmmaker
In 1965, Imamura established his own production company, Imamura Productions. His first independent feature was a free adaptation of a novel by Akiyuki Nosaka, The Pornographers (1966), which is nowadays regarded as one of his best-known films in the West. In 1967, he followed with the pseudo-documentary A Man Vanishes, which, while following a woman searching for her missing fiancé, increasingly blurred the line between non-fiction and fiction. His 1968 film Profound Desires of the Gods investigated the clash between modern and traditional societies on a southern Japanese island. One of Imamura's more ambitious and costly projects, this film's poor box-office performance led to a retreat back into smaller productions, causing him to direct a series of documentaries over the next decade, often for Japanese television.

History of Postwar Japan as Told by a Bar Hostess and Karayuki-san, the Making of a Prostitute were two of these projects, both focusing on one of his favorite themes: Strong women who survive on the periphery of Japanese society. Two others followed Japanese ex-soldiers in Malaysia and Thailand reluctant to returning home, and speaking openly about their past war crimes on camera.

Imamura returned to fiction with the 1979 Vengeance Is Mine, based on the true story of serial killer Akira Nishiguchi. Two large-scale remakes followed, Eijanaika (1981), a re-imagining of Sun in the Last Days of the Shogunate, and The Ballad of Narayama (1983), a re-telling of Keisuke Kinoshita's 1958 The Ballad of Narayama. For the latter, Imamura received his first Palme d'Or at the 1983 Cannes Film Festival. 

Black Rain (1989) portrayed the effect of the bombing of Hiroshima on a family years after the incident. Film scholar Alexander Jacoby discovered an uncommon, "almost Ozu-like quietism" in this film. The Eel (1997) again secured Imamura a Palme d'Or, this time shared with Abbas Kiarostami's Taste of Cherry.

Starting with The Eel, Imamura's eldest son Daisuke Tengan worked on the screenplays of his films, including Imamura's contribution to the anthology film 11'09"01 September 11 (2002), his last directorial effort. In 2002, Imamura played the role of a historian in the South Korean film 2009: Lost Memories.

Imamura died on 30 May 2006, aged 79.

Themes
Seeing himself as a cultural anthropologist, Imamura stated, "I like to make messy films", and "I am interested in the relationship of the lower part of the human body and the lower part of the social structure... I ask myself what differentiates humans from other animals. What is a human being? I look for the answer by continuing to make films".

Legacy
Imamura founded the Japan Institute of the Moving Image as the Yokohama Vocational School of Broadcast and Film (Yokohama Hōsō Eiga Senmon Gakkō) in 1975. While a student at this school, director Takashi Miike was given his first film credit as assistant director on Imamura's 1987 film Zegen.

Filmography (selected)
All films are as director except where otherwise noted.

Films
 1958: Stolen Desire
 1958: Nishi Ginza Station
 1958: Endless Desire
 1959: My Second Brother
 1961: Pigs and Battleships
 1962: Foundry Town (co-writer only)
 1963: The Insect Woman
 1964: Unholy Desire
 1966: The Pornographers
 1967: A Man Vanishes
 1968: Higashi Shinakai (writer and producer only)
 1968: Profound Desires of the Gods
 1970: History of Postwar Japan as Told by a Bar Hostess
 1976: The Youth Killer (producer only)
 1979: Vengeance is Mine
 1981: Eijanaika
 1983: The Ballad of Narayama
 1987: Zegen
 1989: Black Rain
 1997: The Eel
 1998: Dr. Akagi
 2001: Warm Water Under a Red Bridge
 2002: 11'09"01 September 11 (episode "Japan")

Television
 1971: In Search of the Unreturned Soldiers in Malaysia
 1971: In Search of the Unreturned Soldiers in Thailand
 1972: The Pirates of Bubuan
 1973: Outlaw-Matsu Comes Home
 1975: Karayuki-san, the Making of a Prostitute

Awards
 1980 Japan Academy Film Prize for Picture of the Year and Director of the Year – Vengeance Is Mine
 1983 Palme d'Or at the Cannes Film Festival – The Ballad of Narayama
 1980 Japan Academy Film Prize for Picture of the Year – The Ballad of Narayama
 1989 Prize of the Ecumenical Jury, Special Mention, Technical Grand Prize at the Cannes Film Festival – Black Rain
 1990 Japan Academy Prize for Picture of the Year and Director of the Year – Black Rain
 1997 Palme d'Or at the Cannes Film Festival – The Eel
 1998 Japan Academy Prize for Director of the Year – The Eel

References

External links
 
 
 

1926 births
2006 deaths
Deaths from cancer in Japan
Deaths from liver cancer
Directors of Palme d'Or winners
Japan Academy Prize for Director of the Year winners
Japanese film directors
People from Tokyo
Waseda University alumni